KWSP-LP 104.9 FM is a radio station licensed to Kerrville, Texas.  The station primarily broadcasts a soft adult contemporary format, with some Smooth Jazz mixed in, and is owned by Home Town Communications, Inc.

References

External links
KWSP-LP's official website

WSP-LP
WSP-LP
Soft adult contemporary radio stations in the United States